Monau is a German surname. Notable people with the surname include:

  (1592-1659), German professor of medicine
 Jakob Monau (1546–1603), German polymath
 Peter Monau (1551–1588), Czech physician

German-language surnames